Khubsoorat is a 1980 Indian Hindi-language comedy drama film, directed and produced by Hrishikesh Mukherjee, co-produced by N. C. Sippy with dialogues written by Gulzar. The film stars Ashok Kumar, Rekha, Rakesh Roshan, Dina Pathak in lead roles. It received critical acclaim and was a box-office success. The film was remade in Telugu as Swargam in 1981, in Tamil as Lakshmi Vandhachu, and in Malayalam as Vannu Kandu Keezhadakki. The 2014 film of the same name was loosely based on it.

Hrishikesh Mukherjee won the 1981 Filmfare Award for Best Film for his direction. Rekha won the Filmfare Award for Best Actress for her role as Manju Dayal. Dina Pathak received a nomination for the Filmfare Award for Best Supporting Actress for her role as Nirmala Gupta.

Plot 

In Pune, middle-aged Nirmala Gupta (Dina Pathak), wife of Dwaraka Prasad Gupta (Ashok Kumar) and mother of Dr. Inder Gupta (Rakesh Roshan), is a strict disciplinarian and runs her household by laws. Everyone in the house, including Inder and Dwaraka Prasad, follow her laws even though they do not approve of them. Soon, she fixes the marriage of her second son Chander Gupta (Vijay Sharma) with Anju Dayal (Aradhana), who is from Mumbai and is the daughter of the rich widower Ram Dayal (David) and is the elder sister of Manju Dayal (Rekha). After Chander and Anju's marriage, Manju comes to visit Anju for some months. Being a playful girl, she quickly gets the disapproval of Nirmala but Inder falls in love with her. Manju also befriends Dwaraka Prasad and gets the trust of everyone in the house except Nirmala. One day, over Inder, Dwaraka Prasad and other family members, Manju performs a small play highlighting the tyranny of Nirmala who was not believed to be at home at that time but she accidentally sees the play. She gets hurt as everyone thinks her a dictator even though she does good to the family members. Moreover, the fact that everyone did not feel free with her but felt free with Manju who is an outsider, hurts her more. The next day, except Manju, Nirmala and Dwaraka Prasad, Inder and other family members leave the house for some days for a wedding. Manju then apologises to Nirmala but she instead banishes her from her house. Seeing this, Dwaraka Prasad loses his temper and he confronts Nirmala which causes him to get a serious heart attack. Nirmala gets tensed but Manju acts timely and saves Dwaraka Prasad. At last, Nirmala understands Manju's character. However, when Inder and other family members return home, Manju leaves the house but Inder follows her to the railway station with Nirmala who stops her. In the end, Inder and Manju get married.

Cast 
 Ashok Kumar as Dwarka Prasad Gupta
 Rekha as Manju Dayal
 Rakesh Roshan as Dr. Indar Gupta
 Shashikala as Bari Gupta
 Dina Pathak as Nirmala Gupta
 David as Ram Dayal
 Vijay Sharma as Chandar Gupta
 Aradhana as Anju Dayal
 S. N. Banerjee as Umashankar
 Keshto Mukherjee as Ashrafilal
 Ranjit Chowdhry as Jagan Gupta
 Rupini as Munni
 Om Shivpuri as Dr. Gokhale
 Anand as Dr Iqbal, Indar's colleague
 Rita Rani Kaul as Farida, Abbas's wife (Guest appearance)

Soundtrack

Accolades 
 28th Filmfare Awards:

Won

 Best Film – Hrishikesh Mukherjee
 Best Actress – Rekha
 Best Comedian – Keshto Mukherjee

Nominated

 Best Director – Hrishikesh Mukherjee
 Best Supporting Actress – Dina Pathak
 Best Story – D. N. Mukherjee

References

External links 
 
 "Hrishikesh Mukherjee's best films": Khubsoorat (1980), rediff.com, 28 August 2006. Retrieved 2 October 2009.

1980 comedy-drama films
1980 films
1980s Hindi-language films
Filmfare Awards winners
Films directed by Hrishikesh Mukherjee
Films scored by R. D. Burman
Hindi films remade in other languages
Indian comedy-drama films
Indian films with live action and animation